Monsieur des Lourdines is a 1943 French historical drama film directed by Pierre de Hérain and starring Raymond Rouleau, Germaine Dermoz and Mila Parély.

It is an adaptation of Alphonse de Chateaubriant's 1911 novel of the same title. The film's director was the stepson of Marshal Pétain and its themes are supportive of Vichyite policy.

It was shot at the Saint-Maurice Studios in Paris. The film's sets were designed by the art director Lucien Aguettand.

Synopsis
A young man from an aristocratic family tires of the country life and moves to Paris where he squanders his inheritance. Returning to his home with remorse, he reconciles with his father and becomes engaged to his true love.

Cast
 Raymond Rouleau as Anthime des Lourdines  
 Germaine Dermoz as Madame des Lourdines  
 Mila Parély as Nelly  
 Constant Rémy as Monsieur des Lourdines  
 Jacques Varennes as La Marzelière  
 Jean Debucourt as Le docteur  
 Louis Salou as Muller  
 Pierre Jourdan as Flibure  
 Jacques Castelot as Le prince Stimov  
 Robert Dhéry as Désiré  
 Camille Guérini as Nestor  
 Jeanne Fusier-Gir as Perrette  
 Paul Faivre as Célestin  
 Madeleine Suffel as Julie  
 André Carnège as Le notaire  
 Janine Clairville as Estelle  
 Bonneval  
 Julien Carette as Albert 
 Claude Génia as Sylvie

References

Bibliography 
 Butler, Margaret. Film and Community in Britain and France: From La Règle Du Jeu to Room at the Top. I.B.Tauris, 2004.

External links 
 

1943 films
French historical drama films
1940s historical drama films
1940s French-language films
Films directed by Pierre de Hérain
Films set in Paris
Films set in the 1840s
Films based on French novels
Pathé films
French black-and-white films
1943 drama films
1940s French films